The A25 road is an east–west main road in the South-East of England. Its carries traffic east from Guildford, Surrey, eastward through Surrey and into mid-west Kent, to the town of Sevenoaks, and then on to Wrotham Heath where it connects with the A20.

The A25 exits east from Guildford, soon crossing southwards over the North Downs at Newlands Corner, to run eastward below the southern edge of the North Downs, with the road's route alternating between the Vale of Holmesdale and the Greensand Ridge, passing through Dorking, Reigate, Redhill, Nutfield, Bletchingley, Godstone, Oxted, Westerham, Brasted, Sevenoaks and Borough Green. It crosses over the River Wey at Guildford, the River Mole at Dorking, the River Eden at Oxted, and the River Darent at Westerham. The A25 has junctions with several major London to south coast roads: the A24 at Dorking; the A23 at Redhill; the A22 at Godstone; and the A21 at Sevenoaks.

A short distance east of Borough Green, at Wrotham Heath, the A25 ends at a junction with the A20, which continues eastward towards Maidstone, and then south-east to Ashford, Folkestone, and then Dover. At its west end in Guildford, the A25 connects with the A3 which takes traffic towards Portsmouth on the south coast. Before leaving Guildford, the A3 connects the A25 with the A31, which continues the westward route to Farnham, before tracking south-westward to Winchester and Bournemouth.

The M25 motorway parallels the A25 between Reigate and Sevenoaks, with connections at Reigate, Godstone, and Sevenoaks. The M26 motorway parallels the A25 between Sevenoaks and Wrotham Heath.

Route

The east of the route the Victoria County History describes as a main road in 1911. Relatively briefly the modern road uses bypasses and straightened cuts. Many of the inns along its path were one time staging inns. One of the earliest sections of the M25 motorway runs parallel and to the north of the A25: hence the London Orbital Road was numbered M25.

As such, most of the route is a single carriageway and a very small minority of it is a dual carriageway: the junctions at Guildford and Redhill.

The range is an intermittently broken by river valleys, variable width escarpment with a steep southern slope, often quarried away into vertical faces, it includes Botley Hill and Box Hill and this ridge is one of the two mentioned ranges of hills which form in the western half the Surrey Hills AONB.

The route has been included in the London-Surrey Cycle Classic alongside the entrances to Hatchlands Park and Clandon Park in Surrey.  The east of the county has Reigate Castle along its route.  Combe Bank Landscaped Grounds and Squerryes Court are along the route in west Kent, bringing the total of listed English gardens along the route to four.

See also
Great Britain road numbering scheme
A roads in Zone 2 (Great Britain's roads)

References

Roads in Surrey
Roads in Kent